Rosemarie Hidalgo is an American attorney and political advisor who is the nominee to serve as director of the Office on Violence Against Women. Since March 2021, she has served as a special assistant to President Joe Biden and senior advisor for the White House Gender Policy Council.

Education 
Hidalgo earned a Bachelor of Arts degree in political science and government from Georgetown University and a Juris Doctor from the New York University School of Law.

Career 
After graduating from law school, Hidalgo worked as a staff attorney for the Door – A Center of Alternatives and Legal Services of Northern Virginia. From 2004 to 2006, she was a social protection consultant at the World Bank Group. From 2006 to 2009, she was the director of policy for Alianza, a non-profit organization. From 2014 to 2017, she served as deputy director of the Office on Violence Against Women for policy. From 2017 to 2021, she was the senior director of policy for Casa de Esperanza. She became an advisor on gender-based violence for the White House Gender Policy Council and special assistant to President Joe Biden in March 2021.

References 

Living people
Biden administration personnel
American lawyers
Hispanic and Latino American lawyers
Georgetown College (Georgetown University) alumni
New York University School of Law alumni
Year of birth missing (living people)